Øyvin Davidsen (1 September 1891 – 6 June 1976) was a Norwegian rower. He competed in the men's coxed four event at the 1912 Summer Olympics.

References

External links
 

1891 births
1976 deaths
Norwegian male rowers
Olympic rowers of Norway
Rowers at the 1912 Summer Olympics
Rowers from Oslo